Spulerina is a genus of moths in the family Gracillariidae.

Species
Spulerina aphanosema Vári, 1961
Spulerina astaurota (Meyrick, 1922)
Spulerina atactodesma Vári, 1961
Spulerina castaneae Kumata & Kuroko, 1988
Spulerina catapasta Vári, 1961
Spulerina corticicola Kumata, 1964
Spulerina dissotoma (Meyrick, 1931)
Spulerina hexalocha (Meyrick, 1912)
Spulerina isonoma (Meyrick, 1916)
Spulerina lochmaea Vári, 1961
Spulerina malicola (Meyrick, 1921)
Spulerina marmarodes Vári, 1961
Spulerina parthenocissi Kumata & Kuroko, 1988
Spulerina quadrifasciata Bland, 1980
Spulerina simploniella (Fischer von Röslerstamm, 1840)
Spulerina virgulata Kumata & Kuroko, 1988

External links
Global Taxonomic Database of Gracillariidae (Lepidoptera)

 
Acrocercopinae
Gracillarioidea genera